National Competition may refer to:

 NZRL Men's National Competition, the top-level rugby league competition in New Zealand.
 National Competition Council, an Australian research and advisory body.
 National Competition of Horsemen, an Icelandic horse racing and breeding exhibition.
 National Competition Policy (India)
 National Competition Policy (Australia)